Haplogroup E-P2, also known as E1b1, is a human Y-chromosome DNA haplogroup. E-P2 had an ancient presence in the Middle East; presently, it is primarily distributed in Africa where it may have originated, and occurs at lower frequencies in the Middle East and Europe.

Origin

Semino et al. (2004) suggested an origin in East Africa: "Both phylogeography and microsatellite variance suggest that E-P2 and its derivative, E-M35, probably originated in eastern Africa." Trombetta et al. (2011) also suggested an origin in East Africa:

The new topology here reported has important implications as to the origins of the haplogroup E-P2. Using the principle of the phylogeographic parsimony, the resolution of the E-M215 trifurcation in favor of a common ancestor of E-M2 and E-M329 strongly supports the hypothesis that haplogroup E-P2 originated in eastern Africa, as previously suggested, and that chromosomes E-M2, so frequently observed in sub-Saharan Africa, trace their descent to a common ancestor present in eastern Africa.

Ancient DNA

Natufian remains were found to have carried haplogroup E1b1 (1/5; 20%).

At Mota Cave, in Ethiopia, the remains of an ancient Ethiopian male, which was dated to 4500 BP, carried haplogroups E1b1 and L3x2a.

Distribution

E-P2 is now found mostly in Africa, mainly in the form of its predominant subclades E-M215 and E-V38. E-M215 is more common in Northern Africa and the Horn of Africa, and is also found at lower frequencies in the Middle East, Europe and Southern Africa. E-V38 is more common in West Africa, Central Africa, Southern Africa and the African Great Lakes, and occurs at low frequencies in North Africa and Middle East.

The paraclade, referred to as E-P2*, and including cases which are neither in E-V38 or E-M215 are either rare or nonexistent. So far none have been found.

 found E-P2 (xM35,xM2) in 10.4% of 48 Ethiopian Amhara, 12.8% of 78 Ethiopian Oromo, 1.9% of 53 South African Bantu, and 2.9% of 139 Senegalese.

 have reported finding E-P2(xP1, xM35) in 11% (1/9) of a sample of Oromo from Ethiopia, 11% (1/9) of a sample of Iraqw from Tanzania, 10% (2/20) of a mixed sample of speakers of various South Semitic languages from Ethiopia, 6% (1/18) of a sample of Amhara from Ethiopia, 3% (1/30) of a sample of Ewe from Ghana, 3% (1/32) of a sample of Fante from Ghana, and 3% (1/34) of a sample of Wolof from Gambia/Senegal.

 reported one individual out of a sample of 199 African American men from Philadelphia with E-P2 (xM35, xM2).

 found E-P2 (xM35, xM2) in: 18% of 22 Ethiopian Jews, 2% of 49 Mossi from Burkina Faso, 3% of 37 Rimaibe also from Burkina Faso, and 6% of 17 Fulbe from Cameroon.

 found E-P2 (xM35, xM2) in 18.2% of 88 Ethiopians.

 found E-P2 (xM35, xM2) in Ethiopian athletes and control groups and reported the following results; General control : 4%(4/95), Arsi control : 8%(7/85), 5-10K : 22%(5/23) and Track and Field: 11%(2/11).

Phylogenetics

Phylogenetic history

Prior to 2002, there were in academic literature at least seven naming systems for the Y-Chromosome Phylogenetic tree. This led to considerable confusion. In 2002, the major research groups came together and formed the Y-Chromosome Consortium (YCC). They published a joint paper that created a single new tree that all agreed to use. Later, a group of citizen scientists with an interest in population genetics and genetic genealogy formed a working group to create an amateur tree aiming at being above all timely. The table below brings together all of these works at the point of the landmark 2002 YCC Tree. This allows a researcher reviewing older published literature to quickly move between nomenclatures.

Research publications

The following research teams per their publications were represented in the creation of the YCC tree.

Phylogenetic trees

This phylogenetic tree of haplogroup subclades is based on the YCC 2008 tree of Karafet (2008) and subsequent published research.

See also

Genetics

Y-DNA E subclades

Y-DNA backbone tree

References

Bibliography

Sources for conversion tables

External links

 Y-DNA Haplogroup E and Subclades from ISOGG
 British Isles DNA Project
 E1b1.org – International Y-DNA project of Haplogroup E1b1 and its Subclades

E

ca:Haplogrup E del cromosoma Y humà
de:Haplogruppe E (Y-DNA)
es:Haplogrupo E ADN-Y
fr:Haplogroupe E (Y-ADN)